Up for the Cup is a 1950 British comedy film directed by Jack Raymond and starring Albert Modley, Mae Bacon, Helen Christie and Harold Berens. The film is a remake of the 1931 film Up for the Cup, also directed by Jack Raymond.

Plot
The Yorkshire inventor of a loom, Albert Entwhistle, heads for London to see the Football Association Cup Final. He has a nightmare of a day when his wallet is stolen and then his girl friend stands him up. Chaos ensues, but in the end, Albert wins his girlfriend back and also a contract for his invention, along with a fortune in cash.

Cast
 Albert Modley - Albert Entwhistle
 Mae Bacon - Maggie Entwhistle
 Helen Christie - Jane 
 Harold Berens - Auctioneer
 Wallas Eaton - Barrowboy
 Jack Melford - Barrowboy
  Charmian Innes - Clippie
  Arthur Gomez - Snack Bar Proprietor
  Lila Molnar - Fortune Teller
 Fred Groves - Mr. Hardcastle
 John Warren - Mr. Cartwright

References

External links

1950 films
British sports comedy films
1950s English-language films
Films directed by Jack Raymond
1950s sports comedy films
1950 comedy films
British black-and-white films
Films scored by Percival Mackey
1950s British films